The Pedestrian Council of Australia (PCA) is a road safety lobby group which seeks to promote walking as a transport mode. The chairman and sole member is Harold Scruby.

Scruby is often quoted in Australian media on matters relating to road safety. The PCA achieves a high media profile by choosing issues and taking a controversial position, such as calling for more point-to-point and mobile speed cameras, and increased fines for pedestrians.

The PCA supports use of an app for dobbing in parking violations and claims that children "do not have the physical or cognitive skills to cross roads on their own until they are 12".

In 2017, the PCA released an advertisement warning against pedestrians being distracted around roads.

Complaints from the PCA have resulted in several ads showing vehicles at speed (in controlled conditions) being banned from Australian television, following his complaints to the Australian Advertising Standards Bureau. It is suggested that this is a result of a few individuals taking advantage of the system, rather than reflecting a common view in the wider community. The PCA has also called for a major tourism event in Adelaide (the Supercars Championship round) to be banned, due to the theory that it encourages speeding. It has also proposed that mp3 players be banned for drivers and for the manufacturers to place warnings on their packaging. The Drift Mode of the Ford Focus RS has also been the campaigned against by the PCA, despite drivers being clearly notified that the mode is for racetrack use only. These positions have been described by critics as nanny state behaviour.

Several anti-bicycle proposals have been put forward by the PCA: banning bicycles from shared use paths, imposing a  speed limit on bicycles and requiring bicycle riders to purchase third-party insurance.

References 

Political advocacy groups in Australia
Pedestrian safety